The 1975–76 Idaho State Bengals men's basketball team represented Idaho State University during the  NCAA Division I men's basketball season.

The Bengals were led by fifth-year head coach Jim Killingsworth and played their home games on campus at the ISU Minidome in Pocatello.

In the first year of the conference tournament, the Bengals lost to Boise State in the first round. The seeding of the three co-champions for the four-team bracket was done by a random draw in late February, conducted via a Saturday night conference telephone call by commissioner John Ronning from Moscow, Idaho. Weber was drawn as the top seed, which included the right to host at Wildcat Gym in Ogden, Utah. At this time, both Weber and Boise still played in small gymnasiums, while ISU's Minidome had about triple the seating capacity of the others; Boise State upset the host in the final.

For a second consecutive year, junior center Steve Hayes was named to the all-conference team, joined by junior forward Greg Griffin; junior guard Ed Thompson was on the second team. Hayes was a unanimous selection.

Postseason results

|-
!colspan=5 style=| Big Sky tournament

References

External links
Sports Reference – Idaho State Bengals – 1975–76 basketball season

 Idaho State Bengals men's basketball seasons
Idaho State
Idaho State